The Peach Girl, also known as Peach Blossom Weeps Tears of Blood, is a 1931 silent film written and directed by Bu Wancang. The cast included some of the major movie stars of the periods including the Korean born actor Jin Yan and the actresses Ruan Lingyu and Zhou Lili.

The film was produced by the Lianhua Film Company and proved an early success for the studio, in no small part due to the on screen combination of Jin and Ruan, the so-called "Valentino" and "Garbo" of Shanghai cinema, and who starred together in several vehicles before Ruan's suicide in 1935.

A print of the film is currently maintained by the China Film Archives.

Plot
The film deals with an innocent country girl Miss Lim (Ruan) and her relationship with the landlord's son (Jin).

Cast
 Ruan Lingyu (credited as Lily Yuen) as Miss Lim 
 Jin Yan (credited as Raymond King) as King Teh-en 
 S.Y. Li as Teh-en's mother
 Wong Kwai-ling as Loo Chi, Lim's father
 Chow Lee-lee as Lim's Mother
 Y.C. Lay as Chow Chuen Chuen
 Han Lan-ken as Slim
 Liu Chi Chuen as Fatty
 Y.C. Wong as Chow's Mother
 S.M. Shen as A Brave Man

Remake
The film was remade in 1957 into a Hokkien-language Singaporean-Hong Kong film, Peach Blossom Weeps Blood, which was directed by Chen Huanwen (陳煥文) and starring Kong Fan (江帆), Pai Yun (白雲), Lin Yanyan (林燕燕) and Ivy Ling Po (then using the stage name Xiaojuan 小娟).

References

External links

The Peach Girl at the dianuing.com
The Peach Girl at the 5th Annual San Francisco Silent Film Festival

1931 films
Chinese silent films
1931 drama films
Films directed by Bu Wancang
Lianhua Film Company films
Chinese drama films
Chinese black-and-white films
Silent drama films